Ajab Gul (Pashto: عجب گل) is a Pakistani actor turned film director, producer and music director who has mostly worked in Pashto films. As well as working in Pakistani cinema he has worked in television and theater.

Career
Ajab Gul has starred in commercial films such as Yaar Baash, Sharabi, Kyun Tum Say Itna Pyar Hai as well as critical performance films such as Dukhtar. He has also starred in a string of successful television serials like Fareb, Girift, Piyas, Sooraj Kay Sath Sath, Musafatain, Pathar, Ghulam Gardish, Tawan, Chashman, Dastar, Sheharzaad. His theatrical play Janam Janam ki Maile Chadar has set a record in South East Asia for its non-stop 1680 shows. His directorial debut was the film Khoey Ho Tum Kahan (KHTK), which had a decent theatrical run upon its release in 2001. Among the high points of the film was its phenomenal soundtrack composed by Zain and some stunning cinematography. The success of this film was so huge that the Indian film industry released a similar movie Humraaz in 2002. Gul made his comeback with his blockbuster Kyun Tum Say Itna Pyar Hai, his follow up to KHTK. In 2012, he directed the play Rahman Baba.

Filmography

Director

Television

See also
 List of Pakistani actors
 List of Lollywood actors

References

External links
 

Living people
Pakistani male film actors
Pakistani film directors
Nigar Award winners
Pashtun people
1964 births
Male actors in Pashto cinema
Male actors in Urdu cinema
Male actors in Punjabi cinema